Luis Enrique Porozo Mina (born June 30, 1990) is an Ecuadorian professional boxer. As an amateur he qualified in the men's featherweight division for the 2008 Summer Olympics as a seventeen-year-old.

Porozo, from Pichincha, came in second at his qualifier when he beat Roberto Navarro. He lost the meaningless final to Idel Torriente but qualified anyway. In his first Olympic fight he beat Navarro in a rematch 3:3+, jury decision.

References

External links
 
 sports-reference
 Qualifier
 Yahoo

1990 births
Living people
Featherweight boxers
Super-featherweight boxers
Boxers at the 2008 Summer Olympics
Olympic boxers of Ecuador
Ecuadorian male boxers
21st-century Ecuadorian people